Jens Haaning (born 1965) is a Danish conceptual, contemporary artist living and working in Copenhagen.

Haaning has produced a body of artworks since the 1990s, which – when seen together – offers an acute reflection of a complex and changing society in the West. The works address the existing structures of power and communication in the global society and necessitate a debate around subjects such as migration, displacement, nationalism, and other aspects related to our coexistence.

Often the works consist of interventions in institutional structures or public spaces. Examples of these are: Middelburg Summer 1996 (1996), which was a temporary relocation of a factory employing immigrant workers to the exhibition space in De Vleeshal, Middelburg, The Netherlands, and Turkish Jokes (1994), a sound piece with a tape-recording of jokes, told by Turks in their native language, which was originally played in a public square in Oslo, Norway. Haaning is known for provocative artwork, with one art historian calling him "the ultimate trickster". In 2021, Haaning was lent $84,000 to create pieces for KUNSTEN Museum of Modern Art Aalborg in Denmark. Haaning sent the museum two blank canvases entitled Take the Money and Run.

Exhibitions
Haaning has exhibited extensively, the main exhibitions include: Documenta XI, Kassel, Germany (2002), the 9th Istanbul Biennial, Istanbul, Turkey (2005), Traffic at CAPC Museé d'art contemporain, Bordeaux, France (1996), Vienna Secession, Vienna, Austria (1997, 1998, 2007), Publicness at ICA, London, England (2003), the 6th Gwangju Biennale, Gwangju, South Korea (2002, 2006) and latest a large survey of Haaning’s works from the 1990s until 2017 at Göteborg International Biennial for Contemporary Art, Gothenburg, Sweden (2017).

References

External links
Artist website
Creative Time
Göteborg International Biennial for Contemporary Art

1965 births
Modern artists
Danish contemporary artists
Danish conceptual artists
Living people